Chhaap Tilak Sab Chheeni, is a Ghazal written and composed by Amir Khusro, a 14th-century Sufi mystic, in popular Western Indian language Braj Bhasha. Due to the resonance of its melody and mystical lyrics, it is frequently heard in Qawwali concerts across Indian Subcontinent. Chaapp Tilak Sab Chheeni is considered as Amir Khusru‘s most known Kalam which is basically a penned version of his imagination of devotion and the joy of oneness with the eternal one. This poetry is an epic example where an inherent middle eastern art form gets entangled with the Indic philology, custom and art a unique twist between the two artforms. This kind of devotion is rarely seen in Islamic ghazals and qawwalis preceding it. This poetry is a great example of the role both cultures played to create this Ghazal and Qawwali which has a unique essence combining both Indic and Islamic culture which inherently created a new unique art form which contributed to the early beginnings of the Ganga-Jamuni Tehzeeb culture to be developed.

The theme of the composition, being the absolute power of a mere glance from the Divine, is a central theme in sufi mystic literature.

This poem has been sung in Qawwali format by notable Pakistani and Indian Qawwals, including Ustad Nusrat Fateh Ali Khan, Naheed Akhtar, Mehnaz Begum, Abida Parveen, Sabri Brothers, Iqbal Hussain Khan Bandanawazi, Farid Ayaz & Abu Muhammad Qawwal, Ustad Jafar Hussain Khan, Ustad Vilayat Khan, Ustad Shujaat Khan, Zila Khan, Abida Parveen, Hadiqa Kiani , Smita Bellur, Lata Mangeshkar, Asha Bhosle, Rahat Fateh Ali Khan, Kailash Kher and Kavita Seth.

Text and translation

Popular culture
The 1978 Bollywood film Main Tulsi Tere Aangan Ki featured a version by Lata Mangeshkar and Asha Bhosle. Another popular version, by Abida Parveen and Rahat Fateh Ali Khan, appeared on the Pakistani musical variety show Coke Studio. Other Indian films which include the ghazal include Saat Uchakkey (2016) where it is sung by Keerthi Sagathia (composed by Bapi–Tutul), Unpaused (2020) - composed by Shishir A Samant and sung by Samant and Sunil Kamath. The song has maintained its popularity over the years, being regularly heard on television talent shows in India and Pakistan, and on social media as well.

References

14th-century poems
14th-century songs
Sufi songs
Sufi music
Indian songs
Qawwali songs
Ghazal songs
Islamic music